Radio Maria Philippines is the Philippine radio division of The World Family of Radio Maria. The station's main studio is located at Sunrise Subd., Brgy. Maliwalo, Tarlac City, with broadcasts heard along various areas in Northern and Central Luzon.

History
Radio Maria Foundation Inc. was founded on February 11, 2002 by Fr. Melvin P. Castro, backed with Rev. Florentino F. Cinense and The World Family of Radio Maria. In 2007, Radio Maria began its broadcasts in Tarlac City. As part of its expansion, its first repeater was opened in Tuguegarao on June 19, 2010, followed by the second repeater in Santiago on February 19, 2011. On January 14, 2016, it inaugurated its latest was third repeater in Olongapo. In March 2018, Radio Maria became available nationwide via Cignal on Channel 315.

List of Stations

See also
Catholic Media Network
Radio Maria

References

External links
Official Website

Radio stations established in 2002
Catholic radio stations